Music to Driveby is the third studio album by American gangsta rap group Compton's Most Wanted. It was released on September 29, 1992 through Orpheus/Epic Records. Recording sessions took place at Big Beat Soundlabs in Los Angeles and at Slips X Factor Studios in Inglewood from May 18 to June 9, 1992. Production was handled by members DJ Slip, MC Eiht and DJ Mike T, as well as The Unknown DJ and Ric Roc. It features contributions from William "Willie Z" Zimmerman on background vocals, keyboards, saxophone and harmonica, EMmage on backing vocals, and guest appearance by Scarface of Geto Boys.

The album peaked at number 66 on the Billboard 200 and at number 20 on the Top R&B/Hip-Hop Albums chart in the United States. Along with the singles, music videos were produced for the songs "Hood Took Me Under" and "Def Wish II".

Background 
Music to Driveby is considered one of the great gangsta rap albums from the golden age of hip hop. Similar to N.W.A.'s Straight Outta Compton, Music to Driveby includes similar themes centered around nihilism, 'hood life and participation in gangs. It is notable for the single "Hood Took Me Under", which was later included in 2004 video game Grand Theft Auto: San Andreas' radio station Radio Los Santos, and has been considered a classic example of gangsta rap by reviewers. The album contains a diss song aimed at the Bronx rapper Tim Dog, "Who's Fucking Who?", as well as numerous shots thrown at Bloods rapper DJ Quik throughout the album.

Track listing

Sample credits 

 "Intro" 
 "Figure Eight" by Blossom Dearie
 "Hit the Floor" 
 "So Ruff, So Tuff" by Roger Troutman
 "Straight Outta Compton" by N.W.A
 "Ain't No Future in Yo Frontin" by MC Breed
 "Hood Took Me Under" 
 "Walk On By" from Isaac Hayes
 "Growin' Up in the Hood" by Compton's Most Wanted
"Jack Mode"  
 "JD's Gafflin" by Ice Cube
 "Home Computer" by Kraftwerk
 "Compton 4 Life"
 "Christmas Child" by Rotary Connection 
 "Give It Up" by Kool and the Gang
 "Compton's N the House" by N.W.A
 "Rollin' Wit' Da Lench Mob" by Ice Cube
 "8 Iz Enough"
 "Year, You're Right" and "Dry Spell" by The Meters
 "Sing a Simple Song" by Sly & the Family Stone
 "(I Wanna Know) Do You Feel It?" by Ohio Players
 "Duck Sick II"
 "Red Baron" by Billy Cobham
 "Rebel Without a Pause" by Public Enemy
 "Top Billin' by Audio Two
 "Dead Men Tell No Lies"
 "Bochawa" by Bill Chase
 "N 2 Deep"
 "Do Your Thing" by Lyn Collins
 "Who's Fucking Who?"
 "Say It Loud – I'm Black and I'm Proud" by James Brown
 "Fuck Compton" by Tim Dog
 "No Vaseline", "Man's Best Friend" and "Better Off Dead" by Ice Cube
 "Gangsta Gangsta" and "Fuck tha Police" by N.W.A
 "South Bronx" and "My Philosophy" by Boogie Down Productions
 "Dope Fiend Beat" by Too $hort
 "Easy Money" by Low Profile
 "This Is a Gang"
 "You're a Customer" by EPMD
 "Gangsta Gangsta" by N.W.A
 "Mind Power" by James Brown
"Hoodrat"
 "Let Me Love You" by Michael Henderson
 "Niggaz Strugglin"
 "Look of Love" by Isaac Hayes
 "I Gots ta Get Over"
 "Playing Your Game Baby" by Barry White
 "Atomic Dog" by George Clinton
 "U's a Bitch"
 "After Hours" by Ronny Jordan
 "Another Victim"
 "Blue's Crib" by Isaac Hayes
 "Def Wish II"
 "Snow Creatures" by Quincy Jones
 "Music to Driveby"
 "Losalamitos Funk Song" by The Three Sounds

Personnel
Aaron Tyler – lyrics, vocals, producer (tracks: 1, 8, 13, 14)
Terry Keith Allen – producer (tracks: 1, 2, 4, 6-11), recording (tracks: 5, 6, 9, 10)
Michael Bryant – turntables, producer (tracks: 3, 10), arranger (track 5)
Brad Terrence Jordan – lyrics & vocals (track 9)
William Fredric Zimmerman – backing vocals, keyboards, saxophone, harmonica
Emmage – backing vocals (track 15)
Andre Manuel – producer (tracks: 12, 15-18), executive producer
Alaric "Rick" Simon – producer (tracks: 5, 13, 14)
Mike "Webeboomindashit" Edwards – recording, mixing
Brian Gardner – mastering
Peter Dokus – art direction, photography
David Duarte – design

Chart history

References

External links 

1992 albums
Compton's Most Wanted albums
Epic Records albums
G-funk albums
Albums produced by MC Eiht